Reggie White Jr. (born March 10, 1996) is an American Canadian football wide receiver for the Montreal Alouettes of the Canadian Football League (CFL). He played college football at Monmouth, where he holds the school's record for receiving yards. White began his playing career with the Alouettes, who signed him in 2021.

University career 
After using a redshirt season in 2014, White Jr. played college football for the Monmouth Hawks from 2015 to 2018.

Professional career

New York Giants 
After not being selected in the 2019 NFL Draft, White Jr. signed with the New York Giants as an undrafted free agent. He spent the 2019 season on the team's practice roster and was released during the following offseason in May 2020.

Montreal Alouettes 
On January 22, 2021, it was announced that White Jr. had signed with the Montreal Alouettes. White Jr. made his professional regular season debut on October 22, 2021, where he had two catches for 26 yards. He played in five games in 2021 season, finishing with 18 receptions for 177 yards and two touchdowns.

Personal life 
White Jr. was born to parents Reggie and Nicole White. White Sr. played for four years in the National Football League (NFL) as a defensive lineman.

References

External links 
Montreal Alouettes bio

1996 births
Living people
American football wide receivers
Canadian football wide receivers
Monmouth Hawks football players
Montreal Alouettes players
People from Randallstown, Maryland
Players of American football from Maryland